Acanthocephala is a New World genus of true bugs in the family Coreidae. The name is derived from the Greek akanth- meaning "thorn/spine" + kephale meaning "head" This name is in reference to the spine on the front of the head.

Species
The known species of Acanthocephala are:

 A. affinis (Walker, 1871)
 A. alata (Burmeister, 1835)
 A. angustipes (Westwood, 1842)
 A. apicalis (Westwood, 1842)
 A. arcuata (Uhler, 1884)
 A. bicoloripes (Stål, 1855)
 A. concolor (Herrich-Schäffer, 1841)
 A. confraterna (Uhler, 1871)
 A. consobrina (Westwood, 1842)
 A. dallasi (Lethierry & Severin, 1894)
 A. declivis (Say, 1832)
 A. equalis (Westwood, 1842)
 A. femorata (Fabricius, 1775) - Florida leaf-footed bug
 A. fulvitarsa (Herrich-Schäffer, 1851)
 A. hamata (Bergroth, 1924)
 A. heissi (Brailovsky, 2006)
 A. latipes (Drury, 1782)
 A. mercur (Mayr, 1865)
 A. ochracea (Montandon, 1895)
 A. parensis (Dallas, 1852)
 A. pittieri (Montandon, 1895)
 A. pleuritica (Costa, 1863)
 A. scutellata (Signoret, 1862)
 A. surata (Burmeister, 1835)
 A. terminalis (Dallas, 1852)
 A. thomasi (Uhler, 1872)
 A. unicolor'' (Westwood, 1842)

References

Further reading

External links

Acanthocephalini
Coreidae genera